The Caroline test is a 19th-century formulation of customary international law, reaffirmed by the Nuremberg Tribunal after World War II, which said that the necessity for preemptive self-defense must be "instant, overwhelming, and leaving no choice of means, and no moment for deliberation." The test takes its name from the Caroline affair.

Historical background

In 1837, settlers in Upper Canada revolted due to dissatisfaction with the British administration in North America. The United States remained officially neutral about the rebellion, but American sympathizers assisted the rebels with men and supplies, transported by a steamboat named the Caroline. In response, a combined Anglo-Canadian force from Canada entered United States territory at night, seized the Caroline, set the ship on fire, and sent it over Niagara Falls. An American watchmaker, Amos Durfee, was accidentally killed by Alexander Macleod, a Canadian sheriff. The British claimed that the attack was an act of self-defense. In a letter to the British Ambassador, Secretary of State Daniel Webster argued that a self-defense claimant would have to show that the:

Requirements
The terms "anticipatory self-defense", "preemptive self-defense" and "preemption" traditionally refers to a state's right to strike first in self-defense when faced with imminent attack. In order to justify such an action, the Caroline test has two distinct requirements:

 The use of force must be necessary because the threat is imminent and thus pursuing peaceful alternatives is not an option (necessity);
 The response must be proportionate to the threat (proportionality).

In Webster's original formulation, the necessity criterion is described as "instant, overwhelming, leaving no choice of means, and no moment of deliberation". This has later come to be referred to as "instant and overwhelming necessity".

Significance
The principle of self-defense had been acknowledged prior to the Caroline test, but it was notable for setting out specific criteria by which it could be determined whether there had been a legitimate exercise of that right. The test was accepted by the United Kingdom and came to be accepted as part of customary international law.

The threat or use of force is prohibited by customary international law and the UN Charter when it is part of a preventive war waged against the territory of any State.  In the Lotus case, the Permanent Court of International Justice decided, "the first and foremost restriction imposed by international law upon a State is that – failing the existence of a permissive rule to the contrary – it may not exercise its power in any form in the territory of another State." The Caroline test was recognized and endorsed by the Nuremberg Tribunal, who adopted the same words used in the test in judging Germany's invasion of Norway and Denmark during World War II.

The right of self-defense is permitted, when the conditions of customary international law regarding necessity and proportionality are met. Article 51 of the UN Charter recognizes "the inherent right of individual or collective self-defense if an armed attack occurs against a Member of the United Nations, until the Security Council has taken measures necessary to maintain international peace and security." The Caroline test applies in cases where Article 51 is not a permissive rule because a defensive action was taken before an armed attack occurred.

To this day, the Caroline test is considered the customary law standard in determining the legitimacy of  self-defense action. In 2008, Thomas Nichols wrote:

Possible examples

The Cuban Missile Crisis, the Six-Day War, and the attack on an Iraqi nuclear reactor are considered the closest situations in which the Caroline test would have been applicable.

See also

 Use of force in international law
 Preemptive war
 Self-defence in international law

References

Caroline test
Law of war
Caroline test
Aggression in international law
Legal tests